Chris Collins is a retired American soccer player who played professionally in the North American Soccer League and Major Indoor Soccer League.

Collins attended school in the Wayne Central School District where he played both basketball and soccer.  He attended SUNY Oneonta where he was the captain of the men's soccer team for three seasons.  In 1978, the Dallas Tornado selected Collins in the second round of the North American Soccer League.  He played outdoor soccer with the Tornado through the 1981 season.  He also played the 1979-1980 indoor season with the Wichita Wings of the Major Indoor Soccer League and the 1980-1981 NASL indoor season with the Dallas Tornado.

References

External links
NASL stats

1956 births
Living people
American soccer players
Dallas Tornado players
Major Indoor Soccer League (1978–1992) players
North American Soccer League (1968–1984) indoor players
North American Soccer League (1968–1984) players
Oneonta State Red Dragons men's soccer players
Wichita Wings (MISL) players
People from Ontario, New York
Association football defenders
Association football midfielders